The relict dace (Relictus solitarius) is a cyprinid fish of the Great Basin of western North America. It is the sole member of its genus.

Relict dace coloration is variable, but generally dusky overall, with olive and brassy shades dorsally. An obvious speckling pattern with patches ranging from brown to green, and  yellowish narrow stripes appear on the back and belly. Lower fins are often yellow, and may be a bright golden shade. The oblique mouth is terminal, and lacks horny cutting edges. The fins are rather small and rounded, with the pelvic fins being especially notable for their paddle shape. The variations on the basic cyprinid plan seem to be characteristic of desert fishes evolving in isolation, with the body adapting for midwater swimming in quiet water.

The relict dace occurs in only a handful of habitats in eastern Nevada, all of which were once covered by the prehistoric Lake Lahontan. Locations include the springs of Buttle and Ruby Valleys, and the drainage systems of Franklin Lake and Gale Lake.

References

 William F. Sigler and John W. Sigler, Fishes of the Great Basin (Reno: University of Nevada Press, 1987), pp. 200–203

Leuciscinae
Fish of the United States
Monotypic fish genera
Fish described in 1972